The men's double sculls competition at the 1992 Summer Olympics took place at took place at Lake of Banyoles, Spain.

Competition format

The competition consisted of three main rounds (heats, semifinals, and finals) as well as a repechage. The 19 boats were divided into four heats for the first round, with 4 or 5 boats in each heat. The winner of each heat (4 boats total) advanced directly to the semifinals. The remaining 15 boats were placed in the repechage. The repechage featured four heats, with 3 or 4 boats in each heat. The top two boats in each repechage heat (8 boats total) advanced to the main semifinals. The remaining 7 boats (3rd and 4th placers in the repechage heats) were placed in the consolation semifinals. 

The 12 main semifinalist boats were divided into two heats of 6 boats each. The top three boats in each semifinal (6 boats total) advanced to the "A" final to compete for medals and 4th through 6th place; the bottom three boats in each semifinal were sent to the "B" final for 7th through 12th.

For the consolation semifinals, the 7 boats were placed into two heats of 3 and 4 boats each. The last-place boat in each consolation semifinal went to the "D" final to compete for 18th and 19th places; the remaining 5 boats advanced to the "C" final to contest 13th through 17th places.

All races were over a 2000 metre course.

Results

Heats

Heat 1

Heat 2

Heat 3

Heat 4

Repechage

Repechage 1

Repechage 2

Repechage 3

Repechage 4

Semifinals

Semifinal 1

Semifinal 2

Consolation semifinals

Semifinal 3

Semifinal 4

Finals

Final D

Final C

Final B

Final A

Final classification

The following rowers took part:

References

Rowing at the 1992 Summer Olympics
Men's events at the 1992 Summer Olympics